The Bangladesh cricket team toured the West Indies during the 2009 international season, from 3 July 2009 to 2 August 2009. The tour consisted of a two-Test series, a three-ODI series, and one Twenty20 International.

Due to industrial action between the West Indies Cricket Board and the West Indies Players' Association, the West Indies fielded a weak team which was missing its entire First XI during the series.

Bangladesh easily accounted for the weakened West Indian team, winning the Test series 2–0 and the ODI series 3–0. In the Test series, Bangladesh recorded only its second and third Test wins ever, its first and second Test wins as the touring side, its first series win as the touring side, and its first Test series whitewash. In the ODI series, it was also Bangladesh's first series win as the touring side against a Test nation, and its first series whitewash against a Test nation. The West Indies won the Twenty20 match.

Squads

 However, the dispute between the West Indies Cricket Board and the West Indies Players Association saw the First XI go on strike. As such, an entirely new team was selected for the Test series. Not a single member of the new squad had played in the side's most recent Test match against England two months earlier, and nine of the fifteen players in the squad had never played a Test.
 in the 3rd day of First test Mashrafe Motaraza got injured in his knee and Shakib was stand in captain for the remaining days and the 2nd test.

Test series

1st Test

2nd Test

ODI series

1st ODI

2nd ODI

3rd ODI

T20I series

Only T20I

Tour matches

First-class: West Indies A v Bangladeshis

List A: University of West Indies Vice Chancellor's XI v Bangladeshis

Media coverage
Television networks
Ten Sports (Live) – India
BTV (Live) – Bangladesh

References

2009 in Bangladeshi cricket
2009
International cricket competitions in 2009
2009–10 West Indian cricket season
2009 in West Indian cricket